Leonard Griffin may refer to:
 Leonard Griffin (soccer)
 Leonard Griffin (American football)
 Leonard Griffin (baseball)